Harvey Boland Hardy (November 27, 1922 – September 15, 1992) was an American football player who played collegiately for the Georgia Tech football team, was a consensus All-American, and was an MVP of the 1943 Cotton Bowl Classic.

Hardy was selected as the 243rd pick of the 1943 NFL Draft (round 26, pick 3) by the Brooklyn Dodgers but did not play professionally. He was inducted into the Georgia Tech Hall of Fame in 1961. He was elected to the Alabama Community College Conference Hall of Fame in 1990.

Hardy was in the Southeastern Conference Football Officials Association from 1957 to 1981, and officiated 23 bowl games.

References

1922 births
1992 deaths
American football guards
College football officials
Georgia Tech Yellow Jackets football players
All-American college football players
People from Thomaston, Georgia
Players of American football from Georgia (U.S. state)